William G. Wagner (May 28, 1950 – September 12, 2021) was an American historian. His research focused on modern Russia. He joined the faculty of Williams College in 1980, after graduating from Haverford College and earning advanced degrees from the University of Oxford. Wagner was raised in Erie, Pennsylvania, and a student of Strong Vincent High School, where he played football. From 2009 to 2010, he was the interim president of Williams. He was also Brown Professor of History Emeritus. He died on September 21, 2021, in Williamstown, Massachusetts, aged 71.

References

External links
Bill Wagner papers at Williams College Archives & Special Collections

1950 births
2021 deaths
Williams College faculty
Presidents of Williams College
People from Erie, Pennsylvania
20th-century American historians
Alumni of the University of Oxford
Historians from Pennsylvania
American expatriates in the United Kingdom
Haverford College alumni
Historians of Russia
21st-century American historians